Fuster, Füster or Fustér is a surname. Notable people with the surname include:

Anton Füster (1808–1881), Austrian Roman Catholic priest, theologian, pedagogue, radical political activist and author
David Fuster (born 1982), Spanish football midfielder
Frank Fuster, Cuban-American criminal defendant
Géza Füster (1910–1990), Hungarian-Canadian chess International Master
Jaime Fuster (1941–2007), Puerto Rican politician who served as an Associate Justice to the Supreme Court
Joan Fuster (1922–1992), Spanish writer, who published mostly in Catalan
Joaquin Fuster (born 1930), Spanish neuroscientist
José Rodríguez Fuster (born 1946), Cuban artist specializing in ceramics, painting, drawing, engraving, and graphic design
Raúl Fuster (born 1985), Spanish football defender
Serge Fuster (also known as "Casamayor", 1911–1988), French judge and writer
Valentín Fuster (born 1943), Spanish-American cardiologist
Vicente Fustér (c. late 18th century), O.F.M., Spanish Catholic priest of the Franciscan Order, and missionary in California

See also
Dr. Augusto Roberto Fuster International Airport, small airport serving the city of Pedro Juan Caballero in Paraguay

Catalan-language surnames